Asparagus flagellaris is a  flowering plant that is native to tropical Africa.

Like related species, the shoot-tips are eaten as a vegetable. The fruit — juicy orange berries with a sweet taste — are also eaten.

References

External links
PROTAbase on Asparagus flagellaris

flagellaris
Flora of Africa
Flora of Saudi Arabia
Taxa named by Carl Sigismund Kunth
Taxa named by John Gilbert Baker